Watch is an unincorporated community in Knox County, Kentucky, United States. Its post office  has been closed.

The origin of the name "Watch" is obscure.

References

Unincorporated communities in Knox County, Kentucky
Unincorporated communities in Kentucky